The Mating Habits of the Earthbound Human is a 1999 American mockumentary directed and written by Jeff Abugov, and starring David Hyde Pierce, Carmen Electra, Lucy Liu, and Mackenzie Astin.

Premise
Hyde Pierce, acting out the role of an alien (credited as "infinity-cubed" in the opening credits), narrates a courtship in a late 20th-century American city, presenting findings and opinions as an extraterrestrial nature documentary. The relationship "footage" is played straight, while the voice-over (with its most often wildly inaccurate theories) and elaborate visual metaphors add comedy. Among other themes the film explores the possibility that, whenever describing their interpretations of other species' acts and feelings, humans may get everything wrong.

Plot
Billy, a shy young man looking for a date, meets the beautiful Jenny Smith at a nightclub. They enter a relationship where Billy is bashful to tell Jenny that he loves her due to fear of being "trapped", and both paramours receive advice from their respective friends. The couple engage in sexual encounters while using barrier devices; during these encounters Billy is unable to reveal to Jenny his affection.

Then, one year after their first meeting, Billy and Jenny decide to take a vacation, and (hastily) sleep together without condoms or diaphragms. Soon after, Jenny discovers that she is pregnant, and argues with Billy, who accuses her of trapping him into marriage. The couple take bad consultations from their coworkers. Eventually, Jenny decides to go to a clinic to abort her unwanted child. Billy comes to his senses and stops her from doing so, resulting in the two confessing their love for one another.

The film ends with Billy and Jenny getting happily married and celebrating the birth of their child.

Cast 
 David Hyde Pierce as Narrator (voice)
 Mackenzie Astin as The Male (Billy Waterson)
 Carmen Electra as The Female (Jenny Smith)
 Markus Redmond as The Male's Friend
 Lucy Liu as The Female's Friend (Lydia)
 Lisa Rotondi as The Female's Slutty Friend (Ian Calder)
 Sharon Wyatt as The Male's Mother
 Jack Kehler as The Male's Father
 Leo Rossi as The Female's Father
 Antonette Saftler as The Female's Mother
 Marc Blucas as The Female's Ex-Boyfriend
 Anne Gee Byrd as The Female's Boss
 Eric Kushnick as The Female's Brother
 Linda Porter as The Wise Old Woman
 Tyler Abugov as The Female's Fantasy Son

Reception
On film review aggregator Rotten Tomatoes, critics gave the movie a 33% approval rating. However, it was well received by its audience, which gave it a score of over 70%.

References

External links 
 

A detailed description of the film at Everything2

1999 films
1990s science fiction comedy films
1999 independent films
1990s sex comedy films
American science fiction comedy films
American independent films
American mockumentary films
American sex comedy films
Films shot in Los Angeles
1999 comedy films
1990s English-language films
1990s American films